Home Truly (Chinese: 回家) is a Singaporean  drama produced and telecast on Mediacorp Channel 8.The drama is a Lunar New Year drama for 2017.It stars Zhang Zhenhuan , Pierre Png and Somaline Ang as the casts of this series.

Cast

Su (Shengquan) family

Peng (Dayu) family

Hong (Shan) family

Bao (Weibin) family

Lian-jie family

Other characters

Original Sound Track (OST)

Awards & Nominations

Star Awards

Home Truly was nominated for four Star Awards in 2018, but did not win a single award.

Music

Development 
Production began in August 2016, and wrap up its filming in November 2016.

The series consists of 20 episodes and aired from 10 January 2017.

International broadcast

Malaysia broadcast
The drama was broadcast on NTV7 from Monday to Friday, at 18:00 MST starting 17 January 2018.

See also
 Good Luck
 List of Home Truly episodes
 List of MediaCorp Channel 8 Chinese drama series (2010s)

References

Singapore Chinese dramas
2017 Singaporean television series debuts
2017 Singaporean television series endings
Channel 8 (Singapore) original programming